Lt. Warren Eaton Airport , also known as Lt. Warren E. Eaton Airport is a county-owned public-use airport in Chenango County, New York, United States. It is located two nautical miles (4 km) north of the central business district of Norwich, New York. It was established on June 17, 1952.

This airport is included in the National Plan of Integrated Airport Systems for 2011–2015, which categorized it as a general aviation facility. The airport has no scheduled commercial operations, but PrivatAir operates flights to Cincinnati for Procter & Gamble employees.

Facilities and aircraft 
Lt. Warren Eaton Airport covers an area of 147 acres (59 ha) at an elevation of 1,025 feet (312 m) above mean sea level. It has one runway designated 1/19 with an asphalt surface measuring 4,724 by 75 feet (1,440 x 23 m).

For the 12-month period ending August 9, 2017, the airport had 17,300 aircraft operations, an average of 47 per day: 81% general aviation, 18% air taxi, and 1% military. At that time there were 14 aircraft based at this airport: 93% single-engine, 7% multi-engine, 0% jet, and 0% ultralight.

References

External links 
 LT Warren Eaton Airport
 Aerial image as of March 1995 from USGS The National Map
 

Airports in New York (state)
Buildings and structures in Chenango County, New York
Transportation in Chenango County, New York
1952 establishments in New York (state)